Perennes Paulette Ruddy Zang-Milama (born June 6, 1987 in Port-Gentil) is a Gabonese sprint athlete.

Career
Zang Milama represented Gabon at the 2008 Summer Olympics in Beijing. She competed at the 100 metres sprint and placed third in her first round heat after Shelly-Ann Fraser and Vida Anim in a time of 11.62 seconds. She qualified for the second round in which she failed to qualify for the semifinals as her time of 11.59 was the seventh time of her race.

In 2010, she won the bronze medal in Doha at the 2010 IAAF World Indoor Championships. Later that year she won the 100 m silver and 200 m bronze at the 2010 African Championships in Athletics in Nairobi. In 2012, she ran a Gabonese national record twice, ending with a best of 11.03 seconds over 100 m to take the gold medal at the 2012 African Championships in Athletics. At the 2012 Summer Olympics, she qualified for the semifinals in the women's 100 m.  In 2013, she ran a national record of 7.12 seconds in the 60 metres in Moscow.

On 21 May 2014 Zang Milama tested positive for a prohibited substance in an in-competition test. She was subsequently handed a seven-month ban from sport.

References

External links
 

1987 births
Living people
People from Ogooué-Maritime Province
Gabonese female sprinters
Doping cases in athletics
Gabonese sportspeople in doping cases
Olympic athletes of Gabon
Athletes (track and field) at the 2008 Summer Olympics
Athletes (track and field) at the 2012 Summer Olympics
Athletes (track and field) at the 2016 Summer Olympics
World Athletics Indoor Championships medalists
World Athletics Championships athletes for Gabon
Olympic female sprinters
21st-century Gabonese people